Peter Lynge Nissen (born 8 January 1924) is a Norwegian aviator and businessperson, best known as the chief executive officer of Widerøe from 1981 to 1988.

Career
Nissen was born in Stokke, and grew up in Torstrand (Larvik). He took his examen artium in 1943, and since this was during World War II the occupation of Norway by Nazi Germany, Nissen fled Norway to join the resistance movement. He travelled to England via Sweden in 1944, and joined the Royal Norwegian Air Force-in-exile. He was decorated with the Defence Medal 1940 – 1945 and the Legion of Merit. Nissen continued in the Air Force after the war, and graduated from the Norwegian Air Force Academy in 1951. He held several leadership positions; among others he served as leader for a contingent of Norwegian forces participating in the Congo Crisis. His last position in the Air Force was that of aerial attaché in Washington, D.C., from 1973 to 1975.

Nissen then embarked on a civil career. In 1975 he became manager of the newly established company Offshore Helicopters, which merged with Helikopterservice already in 1977. Nissen was then the chief executive officer of Fred. Olsen Airtransport from 1977 to 1981. In 1981 he took over as chief executive officer of Widerøe. He remained here until 1988. Nissen also served as president of Norsk Aero Klubb from 1982 to 1990. During his time in Widerøe, a disastrous incident occurred. The Widerøe Flight 933 crashed near Gamvik, killing all fifteen on board. In 1988 Nissen himself declared that the crash as "unsolved". In 2004, Nissen still held this opinion, despite that two prior investigation commissions had announced conclusive answers. Another major part of Nissen's period in Widerøe was the replacing of Twin Otter planes with Dash 7.

From 1988 to 1994 Nissen worked as manager of Røde Kors Automatene. He had previously been board member from 1981 and board chairman from 1986. He was also involved in Foreningen det nasjonale flymuseum, opposing the establishment of the Norwegian Aviation Museum in Bodø. He lived in Frogner for many years, but now resides in Stavern.

References

1924 births
Living people
Norwegian World War II pilots
Royal Norwegian Air Force personnel of World War II
Norwegian expatriates in the United Kingdom
Norwegian expatriates in the United States
Norwegian aviators
Royal Norwegian Air Force Academy alumni
Norwegian airline chief executives
Widerøe people
People from Larvik
Foreign recipients of the Legion of Merit
Non-British Royal Air Force personnel of World War II